Tiffany Jackson may refer to:

Tiffany Jackson (basketball) (1985–2022), American basketball player and coach
 Tiffany Jackson (soprano), American jazz and operatic soprano
 Tiffany D. Jackson, American writer